The 1998–99 season of the NOFV-Oberliga was the fifth season of the league at tier four (IV) of the German football league system.

The NOFV-Oberliga was split into two divisions, NOFV-Oberliga Nord and NOFV-Oberliga Süd. The champions of each, Hertha BSC (A) and VfL Halle 1896, as well as Tennis Borussia Berlin (A), were directly promoted to the 1999–2000 Regionalliga Nordost.

North

South

External links 
 NOFV-Online – official website of the North-East German Football Association 

NOFV-Oberliga seasons
4
Germ